Logan Maile Lei Tom (born May 25, 1981) was an American indoor volleyball, beach volleyball player, and is current head coach of the Israel women's national volleyball team. She is a four-time Olympian at the outside hitter position. At age 19, Logan became the youngest woman ever to be selected for an American Olympic volleyball team when she competed at the 2000 Olympic Games in Sydney. She is a skilled all-around player who brings stability to the American serve receive and defense, while also providing the team with a solid attack and block at the net. She had been a huge part of the national team from 2000 to 2012. At the 2008 Olympics, Tom helped Team USA win a silver medal and was named Best Scorer, she won another silver medal at the 2012 Olympics with the national team. She was also awarded the Most Valuable Player of the 2004 FIVB World Grand Prix.

In October 2021, she was inducted into the International Volleyball Hall of Fame, along with Clay Stanley and Todd Rogers.

High school and  personal life
Logan Tom was born in Napa, California to Kristine and Melvyn Tom. Her father was a  defensive end for nine years in the NFL with the Philadelphia Eagles and the Chicago Bears.  Though she grew up with her mother and older brother Landon in Salt Lake City, Utah, she spent her summers with her father and his relatives in Hawaii learning how to surf. She is of Chinese Hawaiian descent.

Tom attended Highland High School, where she set the Utah state records for career kills (later broken when Utah moved to five game matches, still second all-time). Tom also competed in basketball and track and was an All-state selection in basketball. She placed third in the state in the javelin as a senior and graduated with a 4.00 GPA and ranked first in her class. Tom also earned the Gatorade Player of the Year awards for volleyball in 1999. In 2000, she became the youngest woman to ever be selected for the USA Olympic volleyball team at 19.

Over the summer of 2003 she was selected as one of eight finalists for the Women's Sports Foundation Sportswoman of the Year Award in the team category. In 2004, Tom posed in a bikini for an FHM magazine article on female Olympic athletes, and one year later was ranked 91st of the magazine's 100 sexiest women list.

Stanford
Tom attended Stanford University from 1999 to 2002 but did not graduate with her class.  She left Stanford 50 units shy of completing her major in International Relations in December 2002, her last term of collegiate athletic eligibility. She officially graduated from Stanford in the summer of 2014. In October 2013, Tom was inducted into the Stanford University Athletics Hall of Fame.

1999 (freshman)
Tom was named the American Volleyball Coaches Association (AVCA) and Pac-10 National Freshman of the Year and became only the fourth volleyball player in NCAA history to receive AVCA First Team All-America honors as a true freshman. She led the Cardinal and ranked second in the Pac-10 in both kills (4.63 kpg) and service aces (0.45 sapg) and ranked second on the team in digs (2.73 dpg). She finished with a total of 472 kills, while also adding a .320 attack percentage (#8 Pac-10) and a 0.94 block per game average.

She was named the NCAA Final Four All-Tournament Team after having 29 kills in the NCAA semifinal match against defending national champion Long Beach State. Her squad finished as NCAA runners-up to Penn State.

2000 (sophomore)
Tom missed a month and a half of the season while playing on the U.S. national volleyball team in the 2000 Olympics. Tom is the first woman in the history of Stanford athletics to appear in the Olympics and then return to compete for Stanford. She was named an AVCA First Team All-American. For the year, she averaged 5.86 kills, 3.20 digs, 0.41 service aces and 0.86 blocks per game and hit .350 for the season. She notched double figures in kills in 16 consecutive matches.

2001 (junior)
Tom was named the AVCA National Player of the Year, in addition to being named the Honda Award winner for volleyball, the Pac-10 Player of the Year and her third consecutive First Team All-America honor. She averaged 5.09 kills, 0.54 service aces, 3.49 digs and 0.90 blocks per game and played in 122 games (35 matches). She recorded 10 or more kills in 50 of 51 matches, dating back to the 2000 season and notched a double-double in 25 matches.

She was named the NCAA Women's Volleyball Championship Most Outstanding Player after leading her team to the 2001 National Championship over top ranked and previously undefeated Long Beach State as she had 25 kills, 12 digs and five blocks against the 49'ers after having 22 kills and five blocks against Nebraska in the NCAA semifinal.

In 2002, she won the Honda Sports Award as the nation's top female collegiate volleyball player.

2002 (senior)
She was named the AVCA National Player of the Year for the second consecutive year and become the third player in NCAA history to be named a First Team All-American for four consecutive years. She was the Honda Award winner for volleyball for the second year in a row and was named the Pac-10 Player of the Year for the second consecutive year.

She averaged 4.89 kills, 0.34 service aces, 3.28 digs, 0.82 blocks and 5.81 points per game and finished off her career with 1,939 career kills and is the all-time leader at Stanford surpassing Kristin Klein (1,909) and is third all-time in the Pac-10. Her 171 career service aces ranks second on in Stanford history and third in the league . She averaged 5.02 kills per game for her career which ranks second all-time in the conference record books.

She was named to the NCAA Final Four All-Tournament Team for the third time in her four years at Stanford, as she had 16 kills, 13 digs, four aces and four blocks in Stanford's losing effort to USC in the National Championship match.

In 2003, she repeated as the winner of the Honda Sports Award, given to the nation's top female collegiate volleyball player.

Olympic and international career
Tom's very first professional appearance was with the Brazilian team, MRV/Minas of the Brazil Superliga, on January 18, 2003, exactly two weeks after signing with them, on January 4, 2003.

Tom appeared in the 2000 Sydney Olympics (4th place), 2004 Athens Olympics (5th place), 2008 Beijing Olympics (silver medal), and the  2012 London Olympics (silver medal). Tom was named the "Best Scorer" of the 2008 Olympic games.

In 2004, Tom was named the Most Valuable Player of the World Grand Prix after leading all players in scoring with 224 points in 13 matches (179 kills, 24 blocks and 21 service aces) where she also garnered "Best Server" accolades.

From 2004–2007, she took a break from the national team, after claiming to be "burnt out" after a disappointing 5th-place finish at the Athens Olympics. However despite that, she continued to play professionally in Italy, Switzerland, and Spain. She also played beach volleyball (partnering with Holly McPeak, among others). She was the 2006 AVP Rookie of the Year and recorded 14 top-10 finishes in 2007.

In 2007, she was named one of three FIVB World Cup most valuable player nominees as she averaged 4.10 points per set at the World Cup in her first international tournament with Team USA in nearly three years. She averaged 3.35 kills, 0.65 blocks, 1.95 digs and 0.10 aces per set at the World Cup while starting 40 of 41 sets.

On September 15, 2008, Hisamitsu Springs, a women's volleyball team based in Kobe city, Hyogo, and Tosu city, Saga, Japan, announced her joining.

She was named Best Receiver at the 2010 World Championship.

Logan earned the Best Server award and the gold medal at the 2011 NORCECA Championship, held in Caguas, Puerto Rico.

Tom joined the Indonesian club Jakarta Pertamina Energi for the 2016 season, taking them to the championship playoff. The New Zealander club Harbour Raiders announced that Tom would play with them and she help them win the local league championship.
She then joined the Israeli club Maccabi XT Haifa for the 2017/18 season.

Web presence
In 2010, Tom began working with the instructional volleyball website Volleyball 1on1 where she appears as an online instructor showcasing her coaching abilities through interactive videos.

Coaching

In May 2021, Tom was appointed as the head coach of the Israel women's national volleyball team.

Awards

Individuals
 2003 Pan-American Cup "Best Receiver"
 2003 Montreux Volley Masters "Best Receiver"
 2003 Yeltsin Cup Tournament "Best Server"
 2004 FIVB World Grand Prix "Most Valuable Player"
 2004 FIVB World Grand Prix "Best Scorer"
 2004 FIVB World Grand Prix "Best Server"
 2008 Summer Olympics "Best Scorer"
 2010 World Championship "Best Receiver"
 2011 NORCECA Championship "Best Server"

College

 Four time First Team AVCA All-American (1999–2002)
 Four time First Team All-Pac-10 (1999-02)
 Four time First Team AVCA All-Pacific Region (1999-02)
 Three time NCAA Final Four All-Tournament Team (1999, 2001–02)
 Two time AVCA National Player of the Year (2001–02)
 Two time Honda Award winner for volleyball (2001–02)
 Two time Pac-10 Player of the Year (2001–02)
 2002 NCAA Stanford Regional Most Outstanding Player
 2002 Pac-10 All-Academic Honorable Mention
 2002 Pac-10 Player of the Week (11/25)
 2002 AVCA National Player of the Week (11/25)
2002 NACWAA/State Farm Classic MVP
 2001 NCAA Championship Most Outstanding Player
 2001 NCAA Stanford Regional Most Outstanding Player
 2001 AVCA National Player of the Week (11/12)
 2001 Jefferson Cup MVP
 2001 Verizon/Texas A&M All-Tournament Team
 2001 Asics/Volleyball Magazine Player of the Year
 1999 AVCA National Freshman of the Year
 1999 Pac-10 Freshman of the Year
 1999 Asics/Volleyball Magazine Freshman of the Year
 1999 Pacific Regional All-Tournament Team

Clubs
 2005/06 Swiss Volleyball League –  Champion, with Voléro Zürich
 2005/06 Swiss Volleyball League Cup –  Cup winner, with Voléro Zürich
 2011/12 CEV Champions League –  Champion, with Fenerbahçe Universal
 2012/13 Brazilian Volleyball Superliga -  Champion, with Unilever Vôlei
2015/2016 Runner up in Indonesian Volleyball League (Proliga) with Jakarta Pertamina Energi
 2017 New Zealand League –  Champion, with Harbour Raiders
 2017/18 Israeli State Cup –  Cup winner, with Maccabi Haifa
 2017/18 Israeli Premier League –  Champion, with Maccabi Haifa
 2018/19 Israeli Premier League –  Champion, with Maccabi Haifa

Other awards
 2013 Inductee to the Stanford University Athletics Hall of Fame
 2014 Inductee to the Utah Sports Hall of Fame
 2015 Named as the Pac-12 Player of the Century by Pac-12 Network

References

External links
 
 
 
 Stanford University college career bio
 Stanford University Olympic career highlights
 U.S. national team bio
 2012 NBC Olympics bio page
 Beach Volleyball Database profile
 Logan Tom unofficial site
 Logan Tom volleyball videos

1981 births
Living people
American women's volleyball players
Olympic silver medalists for the United States in volleyball
Volleyball players at the 2000 Summer Olympics
Volleyball players at the 2004 Summer Olympics
Volleyball players at the 2008 Summer Olympics
Native Hawaiian sportspeople
People from Napa, California
Sportspeople from Salt Lake City
Volleyball players from Long Beach, California
Stanford Cardinal women's volleyball players
Fenerbahçe volleyballers
American sportspeople of Chinese descent
Volleyball players at the 2012 Summer Olympics
Medalists at the 2012 Summer Olympics
Medalists at the 2008 Summer Olympics
American expatriate sportspeople in Spain
American expatriate sportspeople in France
Outside hitters
American expatriate sportspeople in Brazil
American expatriate sportspeople in Italy
American expatriate sportspeople in Switzerland
American expatriate sportspeople in Russia
American expatriate sportspeople in Japan
American expatriate sportspeople in China
American expatriate sportspeople in Turkey
American expatriate sportspeople in Indonesia
American expatriate sportspeople in Israel
American expatriate sportspeople in New Zealand
Expatriate volleyball players in Spain
Expatriate volleyball players in France
Expatriate volleyball players in Brazil
Expatriate volleyball players in Italy
Expatriate volleyball players in Switzerland
Expatriate volleyball players in Russia
Expatriate volleyball players in Japan
Expatriate volleyball players in China
Expatriate volleyball players in Turkey
Expatriate volleyball players in Indonesia
Expatriate volleyball players in Israel
Expatriate volleyball players in New Zealand
Volleyball coaches of international teams
American volleyball coaches